Ainārs Ķiksis (born 10 February 1972) is a Latvian former track cyclist. He competed at the 1992, 1996 and the 2000 Summer Olympics.

Ķiksis won a silver medal in the keirin at 1998 UCI Track Cycling World Championships.

References

External links
 
 
 
 

1972 births
Living people
Latvian male cyclists
Olympic cyclists of Latvia
Cyclists at the 1992 Summer Olympics
Cyclists at the 1996 Summer Olympics
Cyclists at the 2000 Summer Olympics
People from Valmiera